The Norman B. Leventhal Map & Education Center at the Boston Public Library is a special collections center in Boston, Massachusetts with research, educational, and exhibition programs relating to historical geography. It is the steward of the Boston Public Library’s map collection, consisting of approximately a quarter million geographic objects, including maps, atlases, globes, ephemera, and geographic data. It is located in the McKim Building of the Central Library in Copley Square.

The center was founded in 2004 with a $10 million endowment as a public-private partnership between the Boston Public Library (BPL) and map collector and philanthropist Norman B. Leventhal.

About the collection 

The center manages the geographic collections of the Boston Public Library as well as material collected by Norman B. Leventhal during his lifetime, known as the Mapping Boston Collection. Its holdings stretch chronologically from the 15th century to the present, and geographically cover the world, with a focus on Boston and New England. The center also holds depository library maps and atlases produced by federal, state, and local agencies, as well as data sets used in geographic information systems.

Four named collections of distinction include:
 American Revolutionary War-Era Maps
 Boston and New England Maps
 Maritime Charts and Atlases
 Urban Maps

Portions of the Mapping Boston Collection are on exhibit and available for viewing at the Boston Harbor Hotel and the Langham Hotel.

Exhibitions 

Notable exhibitions at the center have included:
 Building Blocks: Boston Stories From Urban Atlases (January 2023 - Present)
 More or Less in Common: Environment and Justice in the Human Landscape (March 2022 – December 2022)
 Bending Lines: Maps and Data from Distortion Deception (May 2020 – February 2022)
 America Transformed: Mapping the 19th Century (May 2019 – May 2020)
 Breathing Room: Mapping Boston's Green Spaces (March – September 2018)
 Women in Cartography: Five Centuries of Accomplishments (October 2015 – March 2016)
 We Are One: Mapping America's Road from Revolution to Independence (May – November 2015)
 Torn in Two: The 150th Anniversary of the Civil War (May – December 2011)

Digital collections 

The center offers digital collections consisting of more than 10,000 objects, primarily with rights status in the public domain. In 2013, the center received a $40,000 grant from the National Endowment for the Humanities to promote digital access to 3,000 cartographic images held by multiple institutions that document the period of the American Revolutionary War (1750-1800). Digital collections appear in an online repository built on the Blacklight search interface, a custom discovery tool called Atlascope, and on the Internet Archive.

Selected publications 

 America Transformed: Mapping the 19th Century (2019) OCLC: 1126349476
 We Are One: Mapping America's Road from Revolution to Independence (2015) OCLC: 918876662
 Torn in Two: 150th Anniversary of the Civil War OCLC: 726743324

Gallery 
A small sample of maps in the collection.

References

External links 

 
 Digital Collections portal
 Atlascope portal
 Atlases and books digitized by the Internet Archive
 Norman B. Leventhal Map Center photos on Flickr

Cultural history of Boston
Public libraries in Massachusetts
Copley Square
Map collections
Boston Public Library